WGTX (102.3 FM, "The Greatest Hits On Earth") is a radio station licensed to Truro, Massachusetts.  The station is owned by GCJH inc.

History
Shortly after the station was licensed (as WTUR in 1988 and later WCDJ in 1992), the original owners, Truro Wireless, Inc., ran into opposition from the Truro local government, who objected to a radio tower being built within the town limits.  Until such a tower was built, the station could not air a regular broadcast schedule.  In lieu of a tower, WCDJ would occasionally broadcast just long enough, via a small transmitter, at 340 watts, to keep their FCC license intact. The first of these limited broadcasts occurred in August 1999.

On March 29, 2007, the FCC granted a transfer of the WCDJ license to Dunes 102FM LLC.  The new owners got the call letters changed to WGTX, and began full broadcast service as "Dunes 102: Cape Cod's Oldies Radio" on August 5, 2007. 

In 2012, the station dropped the "Oldies" moniker from its branding, re-branding itself as "Cape Cod's 102.3, The Dunes", in light of the format-wide re-branding of 'oldies' stations.

On March 31, 2021, the station began stunting with an unknown amount of diverse songs. The next day on April 1, 2021, the station was purchased and rebranded as X1023.FM The Greatest Hits On Earth by Gary Hanna owner of GCJH Inc. based in Brewster, Massachusetts. The station began broadcasting in HD for the first time and offers 2 additional HD Radio formats. Formats include The Whale; Nex-Gen Classic Rock; and Acoustic Cafe, a light acoustic format.

References

External links

GTX
Classic hits radio stations in the United States
Truro, Massachusetts
Radio stations established in 2007
2007 establishments in Massachusetts